Hot Country Songs is a chart that ranks the top-performing country music songs in the United States, published by Billboard magazine.  In 1996, 28 different songs topped the chart, then published under the title Hot Country Singles & Tracks, in 52 issues of the magazine, based on weekly airplay data from country music radio stations compiled by Nielsen Broadcast Data Systems.

The first number one of the year was "Rebecca Lynn" by Bryan White, which moved into the top spot in the issue dated January 6 and remained in place for only a single week before being replaced by "It Matters to Me" by Faith Hill.  Canadian singer Shania Twain had the most number ones in 1996, topping the chart with "(If You're Not in It for Love) I'm Outta Here!", "You Win My Love" and "No One Needs to Know".  The three songs spent a total of five weeks at the top of the chart, tying Twain for the most weeks at number one by an artist with George Strait, who spent two weeks in the top spot with "Blue Clear Sky" and three with "Carried Away".  Alan Jackson, Patty Loveless and Bryan White were the only other acts to have more than one number one in 1996.  The longest unbroken run at number one in 1996 was three weeks, which was achieved by seven different songs.

The final number one of the year was "One Way Ticket (Because I Can)" by LeAnn Rimes, which was the teenaged vocalist's first number one in the U.S.  It would, however, prove to be the only country chart-topper for Rimes,  whose career has fluctuated between country and pop.  Other artists to top the chart for the first time in 1996 were Martina McBride with "Wild Angels", Deana Carter with "Strawberry Wine",  Lonestar with "No News", and Rhett Akins with "Don't Get Me Started".

Chart history

See also
1996 in music
List of artists who reached number one on the U.S. country chart

References

1996
1996 record charts
Country